City Mills Dam was a dam on the Chattahoochee River, between Downtown Columbus, Georgia, and Phenix City, Alabama. The dam was built in 1907 to power the City Mills grist mill. Previously, a wooden dam dating to 1828 had existed at the site.

The City of Columbus, Georgia, breached the dam on March 12, 2013, to create an urban whitewater area on the river.

References

External links
Historic American Engineering Record (HAER) documentation, filed under Columbus, Muscogee County, GA:

DCity Mills
Buildings and structures in Columbus, Georgia
Buildings and structures in Muscogee County, Georgia
Buildings and structures in Russell County, Alabama
Dams completed in 1907
Dams in Alabama
Dams in Georgia (U.S. state)
Historic American Engineering Record in Georgia (U.S. state)
United States local public utility dams